Fier District was one of the  was one of the 36 districts of Albania, which were dissolved in July 2000 and replaced by 12 counties. It is in the south-west of the country, and its capital was the city of Fier. Its territory is now part of Fier County: the municipalities of Fier, Patos and Roskovec.

Administrative divisions
The district consisted of the following municipalities:

Cakran
Dërmenas
Fier
Frakull
Kuman
Kurjan
Levan
Libofshë
Mbrostar
Patos
Portëz
Qendër
Roskovec
Ruzhdie
Strum
Topojë
Zharrëz

References

Districts of Albania
Geography of Fier County